Muirlea is a rural locality in the City of Ipswich, Queensland, Australia.

Geography
Part of the north west boundary of the suburb is marked by the Brisbane River.  The southern boundary aligns with the Warrego Highway.

History
The district was originally part of Brassall. It takes its present name from its former railway station, which in turn was named in June 1884, coined from the surname of local landowners John Muir and Andrew Muir with lea meaning pasture.

In 2013, fire ants were found in the suburb.

References

City of Ipswich
Localities in Queensland